The sultan tit (Melanochlora sultanea) is an Asian forest bird with a yellow crest, dark bill, black upperparts plumage and yellow underparts. The sexes are similar. The female has greenish-black upperparts and a yellowish throat. The young bird is duller than the adult and has a shorter crest. It is the only member of the monotypic genus Melanochlora, which is fairly distinct from the Parus tits with the nearest relative being the monotypic Sylviparus.

Description
The male has the forehead and crown with the crest brilliant yellow; the whole upper plumage, sides of the head and neck, chin, throat, and breast-deep black glossed with green, the edges of the feathers of the upper plumage with a metallic lustre, and the outermost tail-feathers tipped with white; lower plumage from the breast downwards deep yellow, the thighs barred or mottled with white. The recumbent crest is raised when the bird is alert or alarmed.

The female has the yellow parts duller; the upper plumage and sides of the head dark greenish-brown; the chin and throat glossed dark olive-green; wings and tail dull black; the feathers of the upper plumage edged with metallic green.

The young resemble the female, but in the youngest stage the bright edges to the plumage of the upper parts are absent, and the greater wing coverts are edged with white.

They forage in the mid and upper canopy singly or in small groups mainly and feed mainly on insects but sometimes feed on figs. Their loud calls with short repeated and variable whistling notes have a tit-like quality. The flight is slow and fluttery.

The bill is black; the mouth dark fleshy; the eyelids grey; the iris dark brown; the legs are grey; the claws dark horn. The length is about 8 inches; the tail measures 3.8 inches; the wing 4.4 inches; the tarsus 0.95 inches; the bill from the gape 0.75 inches.

Taxonomy and systematics

In 1890, Richard Bowdler Sharpe considered this species as a member of the former subfamily Liotrichinae within the Timaliidae. The position of this species within its clade is still not clearly established. They appear to have distinctive mtDNA cytochrome b sequences, suggesting that they might not belong to the Paridae unless the penduline tits are included. They show an unusual behaviour of panicking in captivity when they encounter unusual noise or other species which has been said to be unlike that of typical Paridae members. Unlike other Paridae, their nostrils are exposed and not covered by feathers.

Distribution

Four subspecies are recognized with the nominate sultanea (Hodgson, 1837) found from Central Nepal into the eastern Himalayas extending into North-eastern Bangladesh, Myanmar, northern Thailand and Southern China. This intergrades with the race flavocristata (Lafresnaye, 1837) is found further south in Thailand, the Malay Peninsula and Hainan. Race seorsa (with dark shaft streaks in the crest) is found in Laos and parts of southeastern China (Guangxi, Fujian) and in its northern range intergrades with sultanea. Subspecies gayeti named after the collector M.V. Gayet-Laroche by Delacour & Jabouille in 1925 has a black crest in both males and females and is found in Laos and Vietnam.

In India, this species occurs in the lower ranges of the Himalayas from Nepal to the head of the Assam valley, the Khasi Hills, Cachar, Manipur, the Kakhyen hills east of Bhamo, Arrakan, the Pegu hills, Karennee, and Tenasserim. This species does not appear to be found above 4000 feet of elevation. It extends down the Malay peninsula. It frequents the larger trees in small flocks. In some forest areas such as the Buxa Tiger Reserve, the density has been estimated at around 15 per square kilometre.

Sultan tits are vocal with several calls including a rattling "chi-dip, tri-trip", harsh explosive hissing calls and squeaky reppeated "wheet" whistles.

The breeding season in India is April to July and the clutch is of five to seven eggs laid inside a lined tree cavity. They feed on caterpillars and sometimes small berries.

Widely distributed within suitable habitats throughout its large range, the Sultan Tit is evaluated as Least Concern on the IUCN Red List of Threatened Species.

References

External links

 BirdLife Species Factsheet
 The Internet Bird Collection

sultan tit
Birds of Bhutan
Birds of China
Birds of Northeast India
Birds of Hainan
Birds of Indochina
sultan tit